The men's slopestyle event in freestyle skiing at the 2018 Winter Olympics took place on 18 February 2018 at the Bogwang Phoenix Park, Pyeongchang, South Korea.

Qualification

The top 30 athletes in the Olympic quota allocation list qualified, with a maximum of four athletes per National Olympic Committee (NOC) allowed. All athletes qualifying must also have placed in the top 30 of a FIS World Cup event or the FIS Freestyle Ski and Snowboarding World Championships 2017 during the qualification period (1 July 2016 to 21 January 2018) and also have a minimum of 50 FIS points to compete. If the host country, South Korea at the 2018 Winter Olympics did not qualify, their chosen athlete would displace the last qualified athlete, granted all qualification criterion was met.

Results

Qualification
 Q — Qualified for the Final

The top 12 athletes in the qualifiers moved on to the medal round.

Final
The final was started at 14:11.

References

Men's freestyle skiing at the 2018 Winter Olympics